The Bachelor Trap is a 1953 West German comedy film directed by Fritz Böttger and starring Oskar Sima, Rudolf Platte and Rudolf Carl. It was made at the Bavaria Studios in Munich. The film's sets were designed by the art director Max Seefelder.

Cast
 Oskar Sima as Vitus
 Rudolf Platte as Füchsl
 Rudolf Carl as Matthias
 Maria Andergast as Katrin
 Ina Halley as Gretl
 Franz Muxeneder as Wurzl, Amtsdiener
 Lotte Rausch as Frau Berger
 Michael Toost as Franzl
 Maria Stadler as Zenzi
 Ellen Hille as Hausiererin
 Ludwig Schmid-Wildy as Anjan
 Harry Hertzsch as Herr Holzinger
 Paula Braend as Frau Wurzl
 Ina Albrecht as Pfarrersköchin
 Liselotte Berker as Frau Holzinger
 Inge Fitz as Junges Ding
 Ernie Bieler as Singer
 Rudi Hofstätter as Singer

References

Bibliography 
 Goble, Alan. The Complete Index to Literary Sources in Film. Walter de Gruyter, 1999.

External links 
 

1953 films
West German films
German comedy films
1953 comedy films
1950s German-language films
Films directed by Fritz Böttger
Films shot at Bavaria Studios
German black-and-white films
1950s German films